Yezekiyevo is a rural locality (a village) in Yudinskoye Rural Settlement, Velikoustyugsky District, Vologda Oblast, Russia. The population was 1 as of 2002.

Geography 
Yezekiyevo is located 19 km northwest of Veliky Ustyug (the district's administrative centre) by road. Kuznetsovo is the nearest rural locality.

References 

Rural localities in Velikoustyugsky District